Portomaggiore is a town and comune in the province of Ferrara, Emilia-Romagna, Italy.

History
In the Battle of Portomaggiore of 1395, mercenary troops of the Ferrara Regency Council, assisted by  allies from Florence, Bologna, Venice and fighting in the name of the young Niccolò III d'Este, Marquis of Ferrara beat the rebel forces of his uncle, Azzo X d'Este, pretender to the Lordship of Ferrara. Azzo X d'Este was captured in the battle.

Main sights
The main attraction of the comune is the Delizia del Verginese, in the frazione of Gambulaga, a castle-residence built by Duke Alfonso I d'Este in the early 16th century.

Notable residents
Davide Santon and Marcella Tonioli, an Italian compound archer, were born in Portamaggiore.

References

External links
Official website
Portmaggiore net

Cities and towns in Emilia-Romagna
Castles in Italy